National Register of Historic Places listings in St. Louis are compiled in the following lists:
 National Register of Historic Places listings in Downtown and Downtown West St. Louis (133 listings)
 National Register of Historic Places listings in St. Louis north and west of downtown (191 listings)
 National Register of Historic Places listings in St. Louis south and west of downtown (115 listings)

See also

National Register of Historic Places listings in St. Louis County, Missouri, around but not in the city